Bellamya rubicunda is a species of large freshwater snail with a gill and an operculum, an aquatic gastropod mollusc in the family Viviparidae.

This species is found in the Democratic Republic of the Congo and Uganda.

References

Viviparidae
Taxa named by Eduard von Martens
Taxonomy articles created by Polbot